Angulomicrobium amanitiforme is a bacterium from the genus Angulomicrobium which was isolated from a fresh water pond in the United Kingdom.

References

External links
Type strain of Angulomicrobium amanitiforme at BacDive -  the Bacterial Diversity Metadatabase

Hyphomicrobiales
Bacteria described in 2004